The Russo-Swedish War of 1656–1658 was fought by Russia and Sweden as a theater of the Second Northern War. It took place during a pause in the contemporary Russo-Polish War (1654–1667) as a consequence of the Truce of Vilna. Despite initial successes, Tsar Alexis of Russia failed to secure his principal objective—to revise the Treaty of Stolbovo, which had stripped Russia of the Baltic coast at the close of the Ingrian War.

Background

When Charles X Gustav of Sweden invaded Poland, captured Warsaw and announced his claims on the Russian conquests in the orbit of the Grand Duchy of Lithuania, Afanasy Ordin-Nashchokin (who led Russian diplomacy at the time) decided it was an opportune time to suspend hostilities against the weakened Polish–Lithuanian Commonwealth and to attack the rear of the Swedish Empire instead. To that end he opened negotiations and concluded a truce with Poland in summer 1656 (the Truce of Vilna, also known as the Truce of Niemież), a move which enraged a major ally of Russia, Ukrainian hetman Bohdan Khmelnytsky who maintained good relations with Sweden and was fighting against Poland.

Campaigns

In July, a reserve force of the Russian army struck across Swedish Ingria and overran two key Baltic fortresses — Nöteborg and Nyen. A separate detachment advanced on Dorpat (Tartu), which fell in October. The main forces marched along the bank of the Western Dvina towards Riga, taking Daugavpils (see Siege of Dyneburg) and Koknese (see Storm of Kokenhusen) on their way. By the end of August, the capital of Livonia was besieged and bombarded.

As Russia had no full-fledged navy to intercept reinforcements coming to the Swedish garrison across the Baltic, Riga managed to hold out until October, when foreign officers commanding a small Russian flotilla defected to the other side and the Russians had to lift the siege. In the aftermath of this reverse, the Swedes recaptured much of Ingria, took the Pskov Monastery of the Caves and inflicted a defeat on the Russian general  at Walk (Valga) in 1657, but were eventually defeated by another Russian general, Ivan Khovansky, at Gdov, on 16 September 1657.

Conclusion
By the end of 1658, Denmark was knocked out of the Northern Wars and the Ukrainian Cossacks under Khmelnytskyi's successor, Ivan Vyhovsky, allied themselves with Poland, changing the international situation drastically and inducing the tsar to resume the war against Poland as soon as possible. Under such circumstances, it was necessary to bring the Swedish adventure to a speedy end. On 20 December, Ordin-Nashchokin negotiated with Sweden the Treaty of Valiesar (Vallisaare), whereby Russia was allowed to keep the conquered territories in present-day Latvia and Estonia — Koknese, Aluksne, Dorpat, Nyslott — for three years.

When the term expired, Russia's military position in the Polish war had deteriorated to such a point that the tsar could not allow himself to be involved into a new conflict against powerful Sweden. His boyars had no other choice but to sign in 1661 the Treaty of Kardis (Kärde), which obliged Russia to yield its Livonian and Ingrian conquests to Sweden, confirming the provisions of the Treaty of Stolbovo. This settlement was observed until the Great Northern War broke out in 1700.

See also
 Siege of Riga (1656)

References

1656 in Russia
1657 in Russia
1658 in Russia
17th-century military history of Russia
Conflicts in 1656
Conflicts in 1657
Conflicts in 1658
Northern Wars
Russia–Sweden military relations
Second Northern War
Wars involving Russia
Wars involving Sweden
Alexis of Russia